Sabbathday House or Sabbath Day House may refer to:

Sabbathday House (Guilford, Connecticut), listed on the National Register of Historic Places in New Haven County, Connecticut
Sabbath Day House (Billerica, Massachusetts), listed on the National Register of Historic Places in Massachusetts